Miscanti Lake (Spanish: Laguna Miscanti) is a brackish water lake located in the altiplano of the Antofagasta Region in northern Chile. Cerro Miñiques volcano and Cerro Miscanti tower over this lake. This  large heart-shaped lake has a deep blue colour and developed in a basin formed by a fault. South of Miscanti lies Laguna Miñiques, another lake which is separated from Miscanti by a lava flow that was emplaced there during the Pleistocene.

The lake is part of one of the seven sectors of Los Flamencos National Reserve. A number of birds and mammals live at the lake, which is a major tourist destination.

Geography  
Laguna Miscanti lies in the Central Andes of Chile, east-southeast of the Salar de Atacama. Administratively, it is part of the Antofagasta Region. A road departing from the Paso Sico international road goes to Miscanti, which is accessible by an unpaved road and numerous footpaths. In 2002, there were 5,000 tourists at Miscanti and the nearby lake Miñiques, and in 2015, one in three tourists who went to the Los Flamencos National Reserve visited Miscanti and Laguna Miñiques. An archeological site called "Miscanti-1" is found on the southeastern lake shore.

Hydrography and geology 

A lava flow separates the otherwise flat lake floor into two basins. In the Atacama Altiplano, Laguna Miscanti is among the biggest waterbodies. The mountains Cerro Miscanti and Cerro Miñiques lie northeast and south of the lake, respectively.

 south of the lake is another waterbody, Laguna Miñiques. In the past, the two lakes were connected, producing a large waterbody which has left beach terraces in the landscape and whose water levels were about  higher than today. The separation of the lakes probably occurred during the Pleistocene, when a lava flow erupted from Cerro Miñiques split the lake basin in two. A number of creeks enter into Laguna Miscanti from the north, east and south (Quebrada de Chaquisoqui), and there are two springs on its northern shores.

Miscanti and Miñiques occupy fault-bound basins; the Quebrada Nacimiento fault is also known as the Miscanti Fault and is part of a detachment fault system east of the Salar de Atacama, which separates the Western Cordillera from the Cordillera Domeyko. This fault extends from the Purico complex, Llano de Chajnantor to Miñiques and has formed a ridge, which has dammed lava flows from Cerro Miscanti and Cerro Miñiques. The basins developed during the Pliocene and Pleistocene; Laguna Lejia also developed along this fault and the fault segment there is also known as Miscanti-Callejon de Varela fault. Volcanoes including Lascar and the Cerros Saltar and Corona north and south of Lascar formed on the fault.

Hydrology 

The Cordon de Puntas Negras is the principal source of water. Water reaches Laguna Miscanti principally as groundwater, which is directed there by the fault; this may explain why Laguna Miscanti is a permanent lake rather than a playa.

The lake has no surface outflow. Presently, water seeps to Miñiques through a lava flow along the path of the Quebrada Nacimiento fault; during former lake highstands a combined lake overflowed into the Pampa Varela basin south-southwest of Miñiques. Most water, however, leaves Laguna Miscanti through evaporation. The town of Peine draws its water supply from the Miscanti basin.

Climate 

During winter, ice develops on the lake surface. The lake area is usually a little warmer than the surrounding region. The region lies between areas dominated by summer precipitation in the northeast and areas dominated by winter precipitation in the southwest.

In the late Pleistocene and early Holocene the climate was much wetter and lakes expanded, especially during the first stage of the Central Andean Pluvial Event. The late Pleistocene—early Holocene wet period was particularly noticeable in the Altiplano, where two separate phases of the Lake Tauca occurred. Conversely, the middle Holocene and the last glacial maximum were dry. During the middle Holocene dry period, the lake may have dried up completely, forming a bog. After about 4,000 years ago, moisture availability increased again. Climate variability influenced human settlement in the region during the Holocene, which took place mainly during wetter periods and became concentrated in several environmentally favourable spaces during dry periods.

Biology 

Widgeonweed grows at the lakeshores, while the algae charophytes and Chara and the water plant Myriophyllum grow in the lake. During its highstands, algal bioherms and stromatolithes developed in the water. Diatoms and ostracodes have been identified in the lake sediments, and amphipods in the lake waters.

There are meadows consisting of Fabiana, Festuca and Stipa chrysophylla around the lake, with sparser vegetation found on the upland, consisting of Baccharis species also known as "tolar" and ichu. Fauna that inhabits the area includes birds like flamingos, Fulica ardesiaca (Andean coot), Fulica cornuta (Horned coot), Larus serranus (Andean gull), Lophonetta speculiarioides (Crested duck) and Podiceps occipitalis (silvery grebe), and mammals like Ctenomys opimus (Highland tuco-tuco), Lagidium viscacia (Southern viscacha), Phyllotis darwini (Darwin's leaf-eared mouse), Pseudalopex culpaeus (culpeo) and Vicugna vicugna (vicuña); the two lakes are important breeding sites for the horned coot. Laguna Miscanti and Laguna Miñiques are part of the third sector of the Los Flamencos National Reserve, and are jointly administered by the community of Socaire and by the National Forest Corporation.

References

Sources 

 
 
 
 
 
 
 
 

Miscanti, Laguna
Miscanti